Jehanabad district is one of the thirty-eight districts of Bihar state, India.  Jehanabad town is the administrative headquarters of this district. Jehanabad district is a part of Magadh Division, and is located on the confluence of two small rivers called Dardha and Yamunaiya.

History
The territory of the present-day district became Jehanabad sub-division of Gaya district in 1872. The district came into existence on 1 August 1986. It is surrounded by Patna in north, Arwal in west, Nalanda in east and Gaya in south.

Jehanabad has a long history of caste wars between upper caste militia landlords and naxalites. It is currently a part of the Red Corridor.

Geography

Demographics

According to the 2011 census Jehanabad district has a population of 1,125,313, roughly equal to the nation of Cyprus or the US state of Rhode Island. This gives it a ranking of 412th in India (out of a total of 640). Its population growth rate over the decade 2001–2011 was 21.34%. Jehanabad has a sex ratio of 918 females for every 1000 males, and a literacy rate of 78.27%. 12.01% of the population lives in urban areas. Scheduled Castes and Scheduled Tribes make up 19.81% and 0.11% of the population respectively.

At the time of the 2011 Census of India, 66.00% of the population in the district spoke Magahi, 29.01% Hindi and 4.83% Urdu as their first language.

Politics 
  

|}

Villages
 

[dhawapur]
Maya Bigha

References

External links
 Jehanabad district website
 Jehanabad Information Portal

 
Magadh division
Districts of Bihar
1986 establishments in Bihar